Cuyabeno Canton is a canton of Ecuador, located in the Sucumbíos Province.  Its capital is the town of Tarapoa.  Its population at the 2001 census was 6,643.

References

Cantons of Sucumbíos Province